Der Wächter nimmt seinen Kamm is a book by Nobel Prize-winning author Herta Müller. It was first published in 1993.

References 

1993 novels
Works by Herta Müller
German-language novels